Admiral Sir John Beverley Kerr,  (27 October 1937 – 2 December 2019) was a senior officer in the Royal Navy.

Career
During his naval career Kerr commanded a frigate, a guided missile destroyer, and the aircraft carrier . In 1986 he was appointed Flag Officer First Flotilla. He was appointed Chief of Defence Intelligence in 1988. Kerr's naval career culminated in his appointment as Commander-in-Chief Naval Home Command and member of the Admiralty Board in 1991. Kerr retired from the navy in May 1994.

In retirement Kerr became involved in the governance of Higher Education. He served on the Council and Court of the Victoria University of Manchester since 1998 and the Court of UMIST since 2000. He was part of the small group that oversaw the merger of UMIST and the Victoria University, including chairing the committee that drafted the charter of the new University of Manchester and became the Pro-Chancellor from its inauguration in 2004.

In 1998 Kerr became vice-chairman of the Commonwealth War Graves Commission. He was also a commissioner of the Museums and Galleries. He also served as a member of the national Independent Review of Higher Education Pay and Conditions in 1999.

Kerr died on 2 December 2019 at the age of 82.

References

|-

1937 births
2019 deaths
Military personnel from Cheshire
Royal Navy admirals
People associated with the University of Manchester
Deputy Lieutenants of Lancashire
Knights Grand Cross of the Order of the Bath